The four venomous snake species responsible for causing the greatest number of medically significant human snake bite cases on the Indian subcontinent (majorly in India) are sometimes collectively referred to as the Big Four. They are as follows:

Russell's viper, Daboia russelii
Common krait, Bungarus caeruleus
Indian cobra, Naja naja
Indian saw-scaled viper, Echis carinatus

According to a 2020 study that did a comprehensive analysis of snake bites in India, Russell’s viper accounted for 43% of the snakebites in India, followed by kraits (18%), cobras (12%), hump nose viper (4%), saw-scaled viper (1.7%), and water snake (0.3%). The rest (21%) were of unidentified species.

Treatment
A polyvalent serum that effectively neutralizes the venom of the Big Four is widely available in India, and is frequently administered to save lives.

References

Snakes
Venomous snakes
Reptiles of India
Animal attacks by geographic location